Svartdalskollen is a mountain in the municipality of Oppdal in Trøndelag county in central Norway. It has an elevation of 1,777 m.

References

Oppdal
Mountains of Trøndelag